Randolph County is a county located in the U.S. state of North Carolina. As of the 2020 census, the population was 144,171. Its county seat is Asheboro.

Randolph County is included in the Greensboro-High Point, NC Metropolitan Statistical Area, which is also included in the Greensboro-Winston-Salem-High Point, NC Combined Statistical Area.

In 2010, the center of population of North Carolina was located in Randolph County, near the town of Seagrove.

History
Some of the first European settlers in this area of the Piedmont and what would become the county were English Quakers, who settled along the Haw, Deep, and Eno rivers The county was formed in 1779 from Guilford County.  It was named for Peyton Randolph, first president of the Continental Congress.

County formation
The Legislature of 1779, then sitting at Halifax, passed an act providing for the formation of a new county from parts of Guilford and Rowan, to be called Randolph.

Randolph County was the original location of the school that developed as Duke University.

The county is home to one of the last remaining covered bridges in the state. The Pisgah Covered Bridge, in Union Township in the southwestern part of the county, was destroyed by a flood in 2003, but has been rebuilt.

In 1911, a new county called Piedmont County was proposed, with High Point as its county seat, to be created from Guilford, Davidson, and Randolph counties.  Many people appeared at the Guilford County courthouse to oppose the plan, vowing to go to the state legislature to protest. The state legislature voted down the plan in February 1911.

Geography

Randolph County is located in the center of North Carolina, and the city of Asheboro (in the county) is the center point of North Carolina. Randolph County is located in the Piedmont section of central North Carolina, generally a region of gently rolling hills and woodlands. The central and western parts of the county contain the Uwharrie Mountains and the Caraway Mountains. These two ranges are the remnants of a much-higher range of ancient peaks.

The highest point in Randolph County is Shepherd Mountain, a peak in the Caraways. The North Carolina Zoo is located atop Purgatory Mountain, one of the peaks of the Uwharries.

National protected area 
 Birkhead Mountains Wilderness
 Uwharrie National Forest

State and local protected areas/sites 
 Liberty Raceway Park
 North Carolina Zoo
 Pisgah Covered Bridge

Major water bodies 
 Back Creek (Caraway Creek tributary)
 Bush Creek (Deep River tributary)
 Caraway Creek (Uwharrie River tributary)
 Deep River
 Little Caraway Creek (Caraway Creek tributary)
 Little River
 Little Uwharrie River
 Randleman Lake
 Reed Creek (Deep River tributary)
 Rocky River
 Toms Creek (Uwharrie River tributary)
 Uwharrie River

Adjacent counties
 Guilford County - north
 Alamance County - northeast
 Chatham County - east
 Moore County - southeast
 Montgomery County - southwest
 Davidson County - west

Major highways
 
 
 
 
  (Concurrency with US 421)
 
 
 
 
 
 
 
 
 
 
 
 
 
 
 
 
 
  (Spur Route)

Major infrastructure
 Asheboro Regional Airport

Demographics

2020 census

As of the 2020 United States census, there were 144,171 people, 56,117 households, and 37,795 families residing in the county.

2000 census
As of the census of 2000,  130,454 people, 50,659 households, and 37,335 families resided in the county.  The population density was 166 people per square mile (64/km2).  The 54,422 housing units averaged 69 per square mile (27/km2).  The racial makeup of the county was 89.20% White, 5.63% Black or African American, 0.45% Native American, 0.64% Asian, 0.02% Pacific Islander, 3.01% from other races, and 1.06% from two or more races. About 6.63% of the population was Hispanic or Latino of any race.

As with much of North Carolina, the Latino population of Randolph County continued to grow into the 21st century. In 2005, figures placed the Latino population as 9.3% of the county's total.

In 2000, of the 50,659 households, 33.70% had children under the age of 18 living with them, 59.10% were married couples living together, 10.20% had a female householder with no husband present, and 26.30% were not families. About 22.50% of all households were made up of individuals, and 8.60% had someone living alone who was 65 years of age or older.  The average household size was 2.55 and the average family size was 2.97.

In the county, the population was distributed as 25.00% under the age of 18, 8.00% from 18 to 24, 31.30% from 25 to 44, 23.50% from 45 to 64, and 12.10% who were 65 years of age or older. The median age was 36 years. For every 100 females, there were 97.80 males.  For every 100 females age 18 and over, there were 95.40 males.

The median income for a household in the county was $38,348, and for a family was $44,369. Males had a median income of $30,575 versus $22,503 for females. The per capita income for the county was $18,236.  About 6.80% of families and 9.10% of the population were below the poverty line, including 11.60% of those under age 18 and 11.50% of those age 65 or over.

Government and politics
Randolph County is a member of the regional Piedmont Triad Council of Governments.

The county is one of the most Republican-dominated counties in the state. It has supported the Republican presidential candidate in all but three elections since 1916. No Democratic presidential nominee has carried the county since Franklin D. Roosevelt in 1940, and Jimmy Carter is the last Democrat to even tally 40 percent of the county's vote. In 1964, it was one of only 13 counties in the state to vote for Barry Goldwater, and the easternmost county in the state to do so. Republican dominance at the local level is so absolute that in some cases, Republican candidates and incumbents run unopposed.

Education
 Randolph County School System serves most of the county. Asheboro City Schools serves Asheboro.
 Fayetteville Street Christian School, located in Asheboro, is the largest private school in Randolph County.

Communities

Cities
 Archdale (part)
 Asheboro (county seat and largest city)
 High Point (part)
 Randleman
 Thomasville (part)
 Trinity

Towns
 Franklinville
 Liberty
 Ramseur
 Seagrove
 Staley

Townships

 Asheboro
 Archdale
 Back Creek
 Brower
 Cedar Grove
 Coleridge
 Columbia
 Concord
 Farmer
 Franklinville
 Grant
 Level Cross
 Liberty
 New Hope
 New Market
 Pleasant Grove
 Providence
 Randleman
 Richland
 Tabernacle
 Trinity
 Union

Unincorporated communities

 Cedar Grove
 Climax
 Coleridge
 Erect
 Farmer
 Level Cross
 Pisgah
 Sophia
 Ulah
 Whynot

Notable people 
 Sam Ard - NASCAR driver; 1983 and 1984 Busch Series champion
 Adam Petty - NASCAR driver. Son of Kyle Petty. Killed in New Hampshire.
 Braxton Craven - educator and second president of Trinity College, which later moved to Durham and became Duke University.
 Henderson Luelling, Quaker abolitionist, horticulturist (born here)<https://en.wikipedia.org/wiki/Henderson_Luelling>
 Gideon Morris - trans-Appalachian pioneer and founder of Morristown, Tennessee
 Heaven Fitch - wrestler
 Heidi N. Closet - African-American drag queen & contestant of RuPaul's Drag Race, season 12.
 Jerry Bledsoe - author
 Jonathan Worth - North Carolina Governor
 Kyle Petty - NASCAR driver. Son of Richard Petty
 Lee Petty - NASCAR pioneer. Father of Richard Petty
 Rufus Hussey - The Beanshooter Man who appeared on The Tonight Show Starring Johnny Carson.
 Richard Petty - NASCAR driver. Son of Lee Petty.
 Naomi Wise - murder victim

See also
 List of counties in North Carolina
 National Register of Historic Places listings in Randolph County, North Carolina
 List of wilderness areas of the United States
 List of future Interstate Highways

References

External links

 
 
 Official Visitor Information
 NCGenWeb Randolph County - free genealogy resources for the county

 
1779 establishments in North Carolina
Populated places established in 1779